Rajasthan state has a good road network.  The name of that highway is Rajasthan State Highway as "RJ SH", There are 48 National Highways in Rajasthan with total length of 10599.67 km (31-03-2019) and 170 State Highways with total length of 15517.5 km.

List

References 
Public Works Department, Government Of Rajasthan
State Highways in Rajasthan

State Highways
 
Rajasthan State Highways
State Highways